1268 Libya, provisional designation , is a dark Hildian asteroid from the outer regions of the asteroid belt, approximately 95 kilometers in diameter. It was discovered on 29 April 1930, by South African astronomer Cyril Jackson at the Union Observatory in Johannesburg, South Africa. The asteroid was named for the country Libya.

Orbit and classification 

Libya belongs to the dynamical Hilda group of asteroids, which reside in, or closely inside the 3:2 orbital resonance with the giant planet Jupiter at 4.0 AU. However, the asteroid belongs to the background population as it is not a member of any known asteroid family within the Hildian dynamical group.

Libya orbits the Sun in the outer main-belt at a distance of 3.6–4.4 AU once every 7 years and 11 months (2,893 days). Its orbit has an eccentricity of 0.10 and an inclination of 4° with respect to the ecliptic.

Physical characteristics 

In the Tholen classification, Libya is a primitive P-type asteroid.

Rotation period 

In June 1994, a rotational lightcurve of Libya was obtained from photometric observations by Swedish astronomer Mats Dahlgren (see ) at ESO's La Silla Observatory using the Dutch 0.9-metre Telescope. Lightcurve analysis gave a well-defined rotation period of 14.05 hours with a brightness variation of 0.08 magnitude. In October 2011, observations by French amateur astronomer René Roy also gave a period of 14.05 hours and a low amplitude of 0.06 magnitude. A low brightness amplitude typically indicates that the body has a spheroidal rather than an elongated or irregular shape.

Diameter and albedo 

According to the surveys carried out by the Infrared Astronomical Satellite IRAS, the Japanese Akari satellite and the NEOWISE mission of NASA's Wide-field Infrared Survey Explorer, Libya measures between 93.44 and 96.708 kilometers in diameter and its surface has an albedo between 0.043 and 0.046.

The Collaborative Asteroid Lightcurve Link adopts the results obtained by IRAS, that is, an albedo of 0.0449 and a diameter of 94.10 kilometers based on an absolute magnitude of 9.12.

Between 2018 and 2021, 1268 Libya has been observed to occult three stars.

Naming 

This minor planet was named after the North African country of Libya, bordering the Mediterranean Sea. The official naming citation was mentioned in The Names of the Minor Planets by Paul Herget in 1955.

References

External links 
 Asteroid Lightcurve Database (LCDB), query form (info )
 Dictionary of Minor Planet Names, Google books
 Asteroids and comets rotation curves, CdR – Observatoire de Genève, Raoul Behrend
 Discovery Circumstances: Numbered Minor Planets (1)-(5000) – Minor Planet Center
 
 

001268
Discoveries by Cyril Jackson (astronomer)
Named minor planets
001268
19300429